Christian Feest (born July 20, 1945, at Broumov, Czechoslovakia, now Czech Republic), is an Austrian ethnologist and ethnohistorian.

Feest specializes in the Native Americans of eastern North America and the Northeastern United States and their material culture, ethnological image research and Native American anthropology of art. He is widely acknowledged for his pioneering research and publications on the early European-Native American colonial contact period, and on the history of museum collections.

Feest studied ethnology and linguistics at the University of Vienna in the 1960s. He started publishing articles in 1964. His 1969 dissertation was titled, ""Virginia Algonkian 1570-1703: Ethnohistorie und historische Ethnographic" ("Ethnohistory and Historical Ethnography of the Virginia Algonquian 1570-1703").

From 1963 to 1993 he worked at the Museum für Völkerkunde (Museum of Ethnology) in Vienna, mainly as curator of the North and Central American collections and director of the photo archive. From 1975 he taught anthropology at the University of Vienna and was habilitated in 1980 with a thesis on "Indian alcohol use in North America". Feest was professor of the ethnology of indigenous America at the Frobenius Institute at the Johann Wolfgang Goethe University of Frankfurt am Main from 1993 to 2004. From 2004 to 2010 he returned to the Museum of Ethnology, Vienna as director. In 1972–3, he served as a post-doctoral fellow at the Smithsonian Institution in Washington DC, and in 1987-8 as a Ford Foundation Fellow at the Newberry Library in Chicago.

He has two prominent brothers, Gerhard Gleich and Johannes Feest. Christian Feest was the editor of the European Review of Native American Studies.

Publications (selected) 
Some of Feest's publications:

Editor 
 European Review of Native American Studies, since 1987

Festschrift
 Ding, Bild, Wissen. Ergebnisse und Perspektiven nordamerikanischer Forschung in Frankfurt am Main, Cora Bender et al., eds, Cologne: Rüdige Köppe, 2005 (with a Feest bibliography).

References 

1945 births
Living people
People from Broumov
Linguists of Algic languages